Diarmaid Cleirech Ua Madadhan (died 1207) was King of Síol Anmchadha.

No details seem to be known of his era.

References
 http://www.ucc.ie/celt/published/T100005B/
 O'Madáin:History of the O'Maddens of Hy-Many, Gerard Madden, 2004. .

People from County Galway
12th-century Irish monarchs
1207 deaths
Year of birth unknown